FCAS may refer to:

 Familial cold autoinflammatory syndrome, a genetic disease
 Fellow of the Casualty Actuarial Society, a U.S. professional society
 Frequency Control Ancillary Services for electric power grids
 Future Combat Air System, a sixth-generation fighter jet currently in development by France, Germany, and Spain
 Future Combat Air System (UK), a sixth-generation fighter jet, the BAE Systems Tempest, and related technologies currently under development by the United Kingdom, Italy and Sweden.